Tu cara me suena is a Spanish reality television series that premiered on Antena 3 on 28 September 2011. It is the original version of the franchise Your Face Sounds Familiar that spans many countries around the world adapting its format.

The series had two spin-offs that only lasted one season each. In 2014, the kid's version Tu cara me suena mini was released, and in 2017 the talent version with anonymous contestants Tu cara no me suena todavía.

Format 
The show challenges celebrities to perform as different iconic music artists every week, which are chosen by the show's "Randomiser". Each celebrity becomes transformed into a different singer each week, and performs an iconic song and dance routine by that particular singer. They receive points from the judges based on how closely their performance resembled the original. The celebrity with the most points will be declared the winner of the night and receive a monetary prize for the charity he/she represent. Points accumulate throughout the season and the overall winner will receive a large monetary prize for his charity at the end of the season.

Seasons

Judges

References

External Links 
 
 
 
 

2010s Spanish television series
2020s Spanish television series
2011 Spanish television series debuts
Antena 3 (Spanish TV channel) original programming
Television series by Endemol
Spanish-language television shows
Your Face Sounds Familiar
Television productions suspended due to the COVID-19 pandemic